Batopilas is one of the 67 municipalities of Chihuahua, in northern Mexico. The municipal seat lies at Batopilas. The municipality covers an area of 2,064.6 km².

As of 2010, the municipality had a total population of 14,362, up from 13,298 as of 2005. 

As of 2010, the town of Batopilas had a population of 1,220. Other than the town of Batopilas, the municipality had 603 localities, none of which had a population over 1,000.

Geography

Towns and villages

References

Municipalities of Chihuahua (state)